HBT may refer to:

 HBT (explosive)
 Haifa Beirut Tripoli Railway
 Hanbury Brown and Twiss effect
 Herringbone Twill cloth military uniforms
 Heterojunction bipolar transistor
 Hole-board test
 Hydrogen breath test